Zaliman is a rural locality (a selo) and the administrative center of Zalimanskoye Rural Settlement, Bogucharsky District, Voronezh Oblast, Russia. The population was 2,569 as of 2010. There are 41 streets.

Geography 
Zaliman is located 2 km northeast of Boguchar (the district's administrative centre) by road. Boguchar is the nearest rural locality.

References 

Rural localities in Bogucharsky District